Super-fire is a single and an EP by American post-hardcore band Girls Against Boys, released in 1996 by Touch and Go Records. The title track was the first single from House of GVSB and it was followed by the second single "Disco Six Six Six". It was released in different configurations, such as a vinyl which only consisted of the title track, a CD which consisted of the title track and the b-side "If Glamour Is Dead", and a CD which consisted of the title track plus "Cash Machine" (also off of House of GVSB) and the non-album tracks "If Glamour Is Dead" and "Viva Roma Star". 

The music video, featuring the band playing in and destroying a room made up of tungsten light bulbs, was deemed too violent for airplay on MTV at the time of release, forcing the band to re-edit the video.

Critical reception
Spin called the title track "a post-rock-gone-hard-rock sonic manifesto." Billboard wrote that the song's "sophisticated groove and overlapping textures tip the hat to techno and trip-hop, but the attitude and invention are pure punk."

NPR included the song on its list of "100 Essential Noise Pop Songs."

Track listing

Personnel 
Adapted from the Super-fire liner notes.
 Girls Against Boys
 Alexis Fleisig – drums
 Eli Janney – keyboards, bass guitar, backing vocals, engineering, mixing
 Scott McCloud – lead vocals, guitar
 Johnny Temple – bass guitar
Production and additional personnel
 Dom Barbera – additional engineering
 Greg Calbi – mastering
 Wayne Dorell – additional engineering
 Rich Lamb – additional engineering
 Ted Niceley – production, mixing
 Ken Tondre –  Roland TR-808
 Andy Baker – assistant engineering

Release history

References

1996 EPs
Girls Against Boys albums
Touch and Go Records EPs
Albums produced by Ted Niceley